Kenneth Augustine Bray (May 26, 1895 – January 9, 1953) was an American Episcopal priest, teacher, sportsman and coach. He founded the athletic program for Iolani School from 1932 to 1953, establishing the "One Team" philosophy touted by many teachers, coaches and students at the school.

Biography
Kenneth A. Bray was born on May 26, 1895, in Barrow-in-Furness, Lancashire, England. His father, the Reverend Thomas William Bray, was once a vicar of St. Paul's Church in Aberdeen, Scotland. Father Bray earned the Bachelor of Divinity degree from General Theological Seminary in New York City and was ordained in 1909. He taught both Greek and Latin at St. Stephens College and Nashotah House, Wisconsin. He also taught at Choate School in Wallingford, Connecticut and The Hill School in Pottstown, Pennsylvania where he coached basketball, baseball, lacrosse and football. During his early teaching years, in 1917, Bray enlisted in the military for service in World War I.

Father Bray moved to Hawaii in 1932, and taught at Iolani School. During the next two decades of athletics, Father Bray distinguished his players with traditions that exemplified outstanding character qualities of excellence, humility, hard work, discipline and sportsmanship. Numerous championships over two decades came as a result of Bray's coaching, including a "Clean Sweep" of three championships (1950–1951) in football, basketball and baseball in the same school year.

Seabiscuit's horseshoe
In 1939, following the epic victory of Seabiscuit over War Admiral in the match race at Pimlico racetrack in Maryland (1938), Father Bray wrote a letter to Charles S. Howard, the wealthy owner of Seabiscuit. He explained how the display of courage had drawn the admiration of not just of an entire nation, but of young athletes from a small school in Honolulu. He requested one of Seabiscuit's horseshoes. Howard responded with more than a letter. Howard sent one of the shoes Seabiscuit used during the dramatic win against War Admiral. The shoe became a talisman for Iolani football players who would ceremoniously kiss the horseshoe on their bus rides to the old Honolulu Stadium.

Influence
Many of Father Bray's "boys" went on to become leading high school and collegiate coaches, teachers, business leaders, and professionals in the medical and dental fields. On June 24, 1981, the Father Kenneth A. Bray Athletic Complex was dedicated at Iolani School. He was honored as a member of the Hawaii Sports Hall of Fame.

References

External links

 Iolani School official website

People from Barrow-in-Furness
People from Wallingford, Connecticut
1895 births
1953 deaths
The Hill School faculty
20th-century American educators
20th-century American Episcopalians